Ramveer Singh is an Indian politician and a member of the Sixteenth Legislative Assembly of Uttar Pradesh in India. He represents the Jasrana constituency of Firozabad district in Uttar Pradesh and is a member of the Samajwadi Party political party.

Early life and  education
Ramveer Singh was born in Firozabad district. He attended the  Jawahar Lal Nehru (P.G.) College and attained Master of Arts degree.

Political career
Ramveer Singh has been a MLA for four terms. He represented the Jasrana constituency and is a member of the Samajwadi Party political party, he was betrayed by the Samajwadi Party and then he contested the 2017 legislative election independently. He joined Samajwadi party again in 2022.

Posts held

See also
 Jasrana (Assembly constituency)
 Sixteenth Legislative Assembly of Uttar Pradesh
 Uttar Pradesh Legislative Assembly

References 

Samajwadi Party politicians
Uttar Pradesh MLAs 1993–1996
Uttar Pradesh MLAs 1997–2002
Uttar Pradesh MLAs 2002–2007
Uttar Pradesh MLAs 2012–2017
People from Firozabad district
1956 births
Living people